Place des Arts is a multidisciplinary arts centre in Sudbury, Ontario, Canada, which opened in 2022. The centre was launched as a partnership of seven francophone arts and culture organizations in the city with a core mandate to serve the Franco-Ontarian community, although it is planned to also be accessible to the city's anglophone residents.

Use and membership 
Member organizations are the Théâtre du Nouvel-Ontario, the La Nuit sur l'étang music festival, the Prise de parole publishing house, the Carrefour francophone de Sudbury, the Centre franco-ontarien de folklore, La Galerie du Nouvel-Ontario and the Salon du livre du Grand-Sudbury. The facility includes office space for all of the member organizations, as well as a 299-seat theatre, a multidisciplinary studio, gallery space for the GNO, youth and children's art programs, a bistro and a bookstore.

Construction 

Construction on the facility began in 2018. The design, by Yallowega Bélanger Salach Architecture and Moriyama Teshima Architects, was unveiled to the public in 2019. It was originally planned for completion in 2020, but faced delays relating to the COVID-19 pandemic in Canada. It was built by Bélanger Construction. 

During the development phase, the project was led by Paulette Gagnon; following her death in 2017, Leo Therrien stepped in as executive director, until announcing in January 2022 that he would step down in April when the centre officially opens.

The centre's official opening date was April 29, 2022.

References

External links

Buildings and structures in Greater Sudbury
Culture of Greater Sudbury
Arts centres in Canada
2022 establishments in Ontario